John Rawlings may refer to:
 John Rawlings (photographer), American fashion photographer
 John Joseph Rawlings, British engineer and inventor of the wall plug
 John Rawlings (priest), Anglican priest
 Johnny Rawlings, Major League Baseball player
 Jack Rawlings, English footballer

See also
 John Rawling, British sports commentator
 Jerry Rawlings (Jerry John Rawlings), president of Ghana
 John Rawlins (disambiguation)